In linear algebra, two rectangular m-by-n matrices A and B are called equivalent if

for some invertible n-by-n matrix P and some invertible m-by-m matrix Q.  Equivalent matrices represent the same linear transformation V → W under two different choices of a pair of bases of V and W, with P and Q being the change of basis matrices in V and W respectively.

The notion of equivalence should not be confused with that of similarity, which is only defined for square matrices, and is much more restrictive (similar matrices are certainly equivalent, but equivalent square matrices need not be similar). That notion corresponds to matrices representing the same endomorphism V → V under two different choices of a single basis of V, used both for initial vectors and their images.

Properties 
Matrix equivalence is an equivalence relation on the space of rectangular matrices.

For two rectangular matrices of the same size, their equivalence can also be characterized by the following conditions
 The matrices can be transformed into one another by a combination of elementary row and column operations.
 Two matrices are equivalent if and only if they have the same rank.

Canonical form

The rank property yields an intuitive canonical form for matrices of the equivalence class of rank  as

, 

This is a special case of the Smith normal form, which generalizes this concept on vector spaces to free modules over principal ideal domains.

See also
Row equivalence
Matrix congruence

Matrices
Equivalence (mathematics)